Paul Llewellyn (born 8 June 1957) is an Australian politician.

Early life
Llewellyn graduated with a Bachelor of Science in biology from Murdoch University in 1977, and a Masters of Science in natural resource management and policy from the University of Western Australia school of Agricultural and Resource Economics in 1984. He has worked as an environmental planning and management consultant, a builder, and wind-energy planner. He has lived and worked in and around the South West for more than 30 years.

Parliamentary career
Llewellyn was elected to the Western Australian Legislative Council at the 2005 state election for the Greens WA as one of the seven members representing the South West region. He was elected for a fixed term, which ran until 21 May 2009.

During his term, he took a leading role in climate, energy and water initiatives. He introduced a range of legislative initiatives into the Parliament, including legislation for renewable energy targets, water conservation targets, solar hot water systems, and emissions controls for power stations. His motion for a gross feed in tariff for renewable energy technologies was passed unanimously through the upper house in 2009.

He retired from the parliament on 21 May 2009.

After politics
After retiring from parliament, Llewellyn became a director of green power companies Mt Barker Power Company and Denmark Community Windfarm Limited.

External links
 Paul Llewellyn's Parliamentary Website, archival

1957 births
Living people
Australian Greens members of the Parliament of Western Australia
Members of the Western Australian Legislative Council
21st-century Australian politicians